Gyrano Kerk (born 2 December 1995) is a Dutch professional footballer who plays as a winger for Belgian club Antwerp on loan from the Russian Premier League side Lokomotiv Moscow.

Club career
Kerk started his club career at Utrecht in the Eredivisie. Kerk  is a youth exponent from FC Utrecht. He made his Eredivisie debut on 28 September 2014 in a 3–1 away defeat against FC Twente. One week later, he scored his first goal against Go Ahead Eagles in a 3–2 home defeat.

On 1 September 2021, Kerk signed a four-year contract with Russian club Lokomotiv Moscow. 

On 21 January 2023, Lokomotiv announced that Kirk will finish the 2022–23 season on loan with Antwerp in Belgium. Antwerp confirmed the transfer on 28 January 2023.

Personal life
Born in the Netherlands, Kerk is of Surinamese descent.

Career statistics

References

External links
 

1995 births
Footballers from Amsterdam
Dutch sportspeople of Surinamese descent
Living people
Association football forwards
Dutch footballers
HFC Haarlem players
AFC DWS players
A.V.V. Zeeburgia players
FC Utrecht players
Helmond Sport players
Jong FC Utrecht players
FC Lokomotiv Moscow players
Royal Antwerp F.C. players
Eredivisie players
Eerste Divisie players
Russian Premier League players
Belgian Pro League players
Dutch expatriate footballers
Expatriate footballers in Russia
Dutch expatriate sportspeople in Russia
Expatriate footballers in Belgium
Dutch expatriate sportspeople in Belgium